Henry Toole Clark (February 7, 1808  April 14, 1874) was the 36th Governor of the U.S. state of North Carolina from 1861 to 1862 during the American Civil War.

Early life
Henry T. Clark was born to a prominent Edgecombe County, North Carolina, planter family.  His father, James West Clark, served as a US Congressman and later as a Navy Department official in the Andrew Jackson administration.  The Clarks were members of that elite planter class that dominated social and political thought in eastern North Carolina. Henry Clark devoted over twenty years to the service of the Democratic Party at the local, state, and national levels, and over ten years as a state senator.

Clark attended The University of North Carolina at Chapel Hill where he was a member of the Dialectic Society.  He graduated with honors in 1826 and later earned an A. M. in 1832.  He joined the bar a year later, though he rarely practiced.  He spent most of his time managing the family's extensive land and slave holdings in North Carolina, Alabama, and Tennessee.  The Clarks owned as many as sixty-two slaves, many of whom were hired out to others for their labor.

Political career
In 1861, Clark was Speaker of the North Carolina Senate. When state governor John W. Ellis died in office, Clark succeeded him (as was the law at the time).  He served as the state's chief executive from July 1861 to September 1862, a crucial period in which North Carolina established itself as a constituent member of the Confederate States and first suffered the hardships of war.  As the leader of the state in that formative period, he mobilized thousands of soldiers for the Southern cause, established the only Confederate prison in North Carolina, arranged the production of salt for the war effort, created European purchasing connections, and built a successful and important gunpowder mill.  The conservative Clark, however, found more success as an administrator than as a political figure.  As governor, he was unable to maneuver in the new political world ushered in by the Civil War, and he retired abruptly from public service at the end of his term in September 1862.

In his later years, he served the local Democratic party and returned for one term as a state senator in 1866.  Clark died at his home near Tarboro, North Carolina.

References

 Poteat, R. Matthew, "A Modest Estimate of His Own Abilities: Governor Henry Toole Clark and Civil War North Carolina," The North Carolina Historical Review,  84 (1) and 84 (2) (January and April 2007)
 , 

1808 births
1874 deaths
American planters
Democratic Party North Carolina state senators
Democratic Party governors of North Carolina
People of North Carolina in the American Civil War
Confederate States of America state governors
19th-century American politicians